Mansur Hakimov (born 30 August 1977) is a retired Tajikistani footballer who played as a forward.

Career statistics

International

Statistics accurate as of 17 November 2004

International goals

Honours
Parvoz Bobojon Ghafurov
Tajik Cup (1): 2004
Regar-TadAZ
Tajik League (2): 2006, 2007
Tajik Cup (1): 2006
Khujand
Tajik Cup (1): 2008

References

External links
 

1977 births
Living people
Tajikistani footballers
Tajikistan international footballers
Association football forwards